Prosopis chilensis is a species of tree in the genus Prosopis, belonging to the family Fabaceae. It is found in parts of central Chile, southern Peru, Bolivia, and Andean (northwestern) Argentina. Its common names include Chilean mesquite (algarrobo chileno, in Spanish), cupesí (in eastern Bolivia), and Chilean algarrobo. It is used for providing shade, for animal feed and for firewood.

Description
The trunk is stout and gnarled, and can reach a metre (yard) in diameter. The bark is pale brown and thick, with cracks and vertical fissures. Each leaflet is oval with a smooth margin and yellowish green upper surface. A pair of strong, curved thorns is borne at the location of each whorl of leaves. The flowers are borne in dense axillary spikes. Each individual flower has five sepals, five petals and ten stamens. P. chilensis flowers between October and December and the fruits ripen between February and April.

Distribution and habitat
Prosopis chilensis is found in Peru, Bolivia, eastern Argentina and central Chile, and grows on light soils in arid regions. It is very drought resistant and it probably fixes nitrogen. It has been introduced into Hawaii, where it is now common growing in thickets behind beaches.

Uses
Prosopis chilensis is used as a shade tree and for firewood. The leaves are used as fodder for livestock and the pods and seeds are of high nutritive value and are ground to make an animal feed. Honey bees, and several other species of bee, pollinate the flowers.

References

chilensis
Trees of Argentina
Trees of Chile
Trees of Peru
Chilean Matorral